Minhang High School (MHS, Chinese: 上海市闵行中学, Pinyin: Mǐnháng Zhōngxué) is located in East Jiangchuan Road (江川东路), Minhang District, Shanghai, China.

In 2007, Minhang High School was selected as an Experimental Model High Schools (实验性示范高中) in Shanghai.

History
The predecessor of the school was the "Shanghai County Junior High School", founded in August, 1928. In its early stage, the school was small-scaled, comprising only 3 classes and 111 students. The original site was within the Education Bureau of Minhang District on Jianshe Rd. Upon the outbreak of Second Sino-Japanese War in 1937, the school was discontinued.

It was resumed in fall of 1940, and was renamed "Minhang County High School". In 1944, it became "Minhang High School of Shenjiang County", and  changed to "Shanghai County Minhang High School" in 1946. After the establishment of the People's Republic of China, it became "Shanghai County Junior High School". In 1951, the school was merged with two senior high classes of the "Private Wenqi Dyeing and Weaving School", founded by Zhu Wenqi(诸文绮), a textile entrepreneur in Shanghai, in 1947, and was renamed "Shanghai County High School". It was relocated to the current campus in 1958. In February 1959, the school changed to "Shanghai County Minhang High School". Minhang became an independent district in 1959, and the "Private Xinmin Junior High School" was merged into Minhang High School in that year. After the formation of Minhang District, the school was administered by Minhang Education Bureau, and thus renamed "Shanghai Minhang High School".

Minhang District was abolished in June 1964 and merged into Xuhui District. In May of that year, the school was accredited with being one of 50 key high schools in Shanghai. In November 1981, Minhang District was resumed and the school has been under its jurisdiction ever since.

Since 1990's, the school has enjoyed notable reputation. After 1996, it was acclaimed as the "Creative Education Experimental Base" of Chinese Creation Society, Shanghai Specialized School of Science and Technology Education, Model School of Shanghai Education Society, National Experimental School of Modern Education Technology, among many other honors and awards.

Notes

External links
 Official website of Minhang High School

High schools in Shanghai
1928 establishments in China
Educational institutions established in 1928